The Platycnemididae are a family of damselflies.
They are known commonly as white-legged damselflies. There are over 400 species native to the Old World. The family is divided into several subfamilies.

Genera 
There are about 50 genera of Platycnemididae.

Genera include:

 Allocnemis Selys, 1863
 Arabicnemis Waterston, 1984
 Arabineura Schneider & Dumont, 1995
 Archboldargia Lieftinck, 1949
 Arrhenocnemis Lieftinck, 1933
 Asthenocnemis Lieftinck, 1949
 Caconeura Kirby, 1890
 Calicnemia Strand, 1928
 Ciliagrion Sjöstedt, 1917
 Coeliccia Kirby, 1890
 Copera Kirby, 1890
 Cyanocnemis Lieftinck, 1949
 Denticnemis Bartenev, 1956
 Disparoneura Selys, 1860
 Elattoneura Cowley, 1935
 Esme Fraser, 1922
 Hylaeargia Lieftinck, 1949
 Idiocnemis Selys, 1878
 Igneocnemis Hämäläinen, 1991
 Indocnemis Laidlaw, 1917
 Lieftinckia Kimmins, 1957
 Lochmaeocnemis Lieftinck, 1949
 Macrocnemis Theischinger, Gassmann & Richards, 2015
 Matticnemis Dijkstra, 2013
 Melanoneura Fraser, 1922
 Mesocnemis Karsch, 1891
 Metacnemis Hagen, 1863
 Nososticta Hagen, 1860
 Onychargia Selys, 1865
 Oreocnemis Pinhey, 1971
 Palaiargia Förster, 1903
 Papuargia Lieftinck, 1938
 Paracnemis Martin, 1902
 Paramecocnemis Lieftinck, 1932
 Phylloneura Fraser, 1922
 Platycnemididae Strand, 1928
 Platycnemis Burmeister, 1839
 Prodasineura Cowley, 1934
 Proplatycnemis Kennedy, 1920
 Pseudocopera Fraser, 1922
 Rhyacocnemis Lieftinck, 1956
 Risiocnemis Cowley, 1934
 Salomocnemis Lieftinck, 1987
 Spesbona Dijkstra, 2013
 Stenocnemis Karsch, 1899
 Thaumatagrion Lieftinck, 1932
 Torrenticnemis Lieftinck, 1949
 † Cretadisparoneura Huang et al., 2015 Burmese amber, Myanmar, Cenomanian
 † Palaeodisparoneura Poinar, Bechly & Buckley, 2010 Burmese amber, Myanmar, Cenomanian
 † Yijenplatycnemis Zheng et al., 2017 Burmese amber, Myanmar, Cenomanian

See also
 List of damselflies of the world (Platycnemididae)
 List of Odonata species of Australia

References

 
Odonata families
Odonata of Africa
Odonata of Europe
Odonata of Asia
Odonata of Australia
Odonata of Oceania
Taxa named by Georgiy Jacobson
Taxa named by Valentin Lvovich Bianchi
Insects described in 1905
Damselflies